Banacek is an American detective TV series starring George Peppard that aired on the NBC network from 1972 to 1974. The series was part of the rotating NBC Wednesday Mystery Movie anthology. It alternated in its time slot with several other shows, but was the only one of them to last beyond its first season.

Premise
Peppard played Thomas Banacek, a Polish-American freelance, Boston-based private investigator who solves seemingly impossible thefts. He collects from the insurance companies 10% of the insured value of the recovered property. One of Banacek's verbal signatures is the quotation of strangely worded yet curiously cogent "Polish proverbs" such as:
 "An old Polish proverb says, 'A wolf that takes a peasant to supper probably won't need any breakfast.'"
 "If you're not sure that it's potato borscht, there could be orphans working in the mines."
 "When an owl comes to a mouse picnic, it's not there for the sack races." 
 "Though the hippopotamus has no sting in its tail, the wise man would prefer to be sat upon by the bee."
 "A truly wise man never plays leapfrog with a unicorn."
 "When a wolf is chasing your sleigh, throw him a raisin cookie, but don't stop to bake a cake."
 "Just because the cat has her kittens in the oven doesn't make them biscuits."
 "You can read all the books in the library my son, but the cheese will still smell after four days."
 "No matter how warm the smile on the face of the Sun, the cat still has her kittens under the porch."
 "Even a one thousand zloty note cannot tap dance."
 "Only the centipede can hear all the hundred footsteps of his uncle."

Part of the joke is that Ralph Manza, as Banacek's chauffeur Jay Drury, will often ask "What does it mean, Boss?" Banacek also has a running agreement with his chauffeur for a 10% share of Banacek's 10% if he solved the crime.  Mr. Drury is never at a loss for a potential solution that Banacek always manages to shoot down with his very next line. Another recurring gag is for other characters—particularly his rivals— to mispronounce his name deliberately. The name "Banaczek" (as pronounced in the show) is actually quite rare in Poland.

Murray Matheson plays seller of rare books and information source Felix Mulholland, a character always ready with a droll remark and who exhibits a passion for chess and jigsaw puzzles. He is also the series' only character to ever call Banacek by his first name.
 
Recurring characters include insurance company executive Cavanaugh (George Murdock), 
Banacek's rival and some-time love interest Carlie Kirkland (Christine Belford), and another insurance investigator/rival Fennyman/Henry DeWitt (Linden Chiles).

Banacek lives on historic Beacon Hill in Boston.
While he has a limousine and driver, he also owns and sometimes drives an antique 1941 Packard convertible.  Both vehicles are equipped with mobile radio telephones at a time when such devices are uncommon and expensive.  Banacek is intelligent, well-educated, cultured, and suave.  An unapologetic ladies' man who enjoys the company of beautiful women, he is also street-smart and can engage in hand-to-hand combat when the need arises; in one episode he mentions having learned combat judo in the Marine Corps, which is probably a reference to George Peppard's two-year enlistment in the Marine Corps, being discharged at the rank of Corporal. He grew up in Scollay Square and a childhood acquaintance described him as the neighborhood jock who excelled in all sports. For recreation he jogs, plays squash, engages in weekend touch football and sculling on the Charles River.

Cast
 George Peppard as Thomas Banacek
 Ralph Manza as Jay Drury
 Murray Matheson as Felix Mulholland
 Christine Belford as Carlie Kirkland
 George Murdock as Cavanaugh

Production
In general the series was shot on the Universal Studios backlot, though location scenes were filmed around Los Angeles in areas that could pass for Boston, or rural areas near there.  The episode titled "If Max Is So Smart, Why Doesn't He Tell Us Where He Is?" was shot on location at the California Institute of the Arts around the time the school first opened. "Ten Thousand Dollars a Page" was filmed at the Pasadena Art Museum, later known as the Pasadena Museum of Modern Art and now the Norton Simon Museum of Art.  "Horse of a Slightly Different Color" was filmed at Hollywood Park Racetrack, now the site of SoFi Stadium.

A customized 1969 American Motors AMX was built by George Barris for the second regular-season episode. The car became known as the AMX-400 and it is now owned by an automobile collector.  Other continuing cars in the series were a 1941 Packard 180 with a Victoria body designed by Howard "Dutch" Darrin (license plate number 178344), a 1973 Corvette (driven by Ms. Kirkland) and a 1973 Cadillac Fleetwood limousine (mobile telephone number KL 17811).  In keeping with both the exotic car theme and the humor between Banacek and his driver Jay Drury, he was even chauffeured around in a  Willys MB, Jeep CJ2A, and a CJ6, as well as a brand new Ford/De Tomaso Pantera.

In preparation for the pilot and then the first and second seasons, the cast went to Boston and filmed a variety of background scenes.  These scenes were then used through the series and are especially shown in the opening scenes, including Banacek rowing on the Charles River and walking through Government Center.  In the pilot, Banacek's car pulls into his Beacon Hill home, the historic Second Harrison Gray Otis House located at 85 Mount Vernon Street. In other episodes, views are shown of the Public Garden, the entry to Felix's bookstore at 50 Beacon Street, and the Esplanade.  The Boston-filmed pieces were done by a second unit and directed by Peppard himself.

Reception
Although the show had a mixture of humor and rather intricate plots, it never generated strong ratings. Despite this, the show was well received by critics. In addition, the Polish American Congress gave the series an award for portraying Polish Americans in a good manner.

Cancellation
Banacek was well received by television critics, and as a result was picked up for a third season. However, before the third season could start, Peppard quit the show to prevent his ex-wife Elizabeth Ashley from receiving a larger percentage of his earnings as part of their divorce settlement. The complication ended any chance of reviving Banacek during Peppard's lifetime. A&E continued rebroadcasts of Banacek in syndication.

In popular culture
The mentalist Steven Shaw adopted his stage name "Banachek" after the television program.

In 2018, Banacek was the subject of an episode-length parody in The Simpsons ("Homer Is Where the Art Isn't"), referencing items from the series' storytelling format to its establishing shots, including Goldenberg's theme music.

The show was referenced by the band Fun Lovin' Criminals in the lyrics of its 1998 single "Love Unlimited".

The character Banacek was referenced in The Simpsons "Treehouse of Horror III" segment "Dial Z for Zombies" when Bart tries cast a spell to rid Springfield of the Zombies he unleashed by intoning the magic words "Kojak, Mannix, Banacek, Danno..." (All names of 1970s TV detectives.) In the episode Homer Is Where the Art Isn't, a parody of Peppard's character, named Manacek, is introduced (voiced by Bill Hader, and the episode is patterned closely after a typical Banacek outing, in this case relating to a stolen work of art that Homer tried to buy at auction. Manacek romances Marge in the course of the episode, saying that seducing a beautiful woman is part of his 'process' for solving a mystery.

Banacek has a clear resemblance to the title character of the Steve McQueen movie The Thomas Crown Affair, particularly in his attitude towards women and authority.  The house used for exterior shots of Thomas Crown's home in Boston was used for Banacek's home in the series.  Both the film and the show revolve around insurance investigations, but in the series Banacek is solving crimes, not committing them.

Episodes

Pilot: 1972

Season 1: 1972–73

Season 2: 1973–74

Home media
Arts Alliance America has released the entire series on DVD in Region 1.  Season one was released on May 15, 2007, without the series pilot. Season two was released on January 22, 2008, and included the pilot episode. On September 30, 2008, Arts Alliance released Banacek: The Complete Series, a five-disc box set featuring all 17 episodes.

In Region 2, Fabulous Films released both seasons on DVD in the UK on February 10, 2014.

In Region 4, Madman Entertainment has released both seasons on DVD in Australia.

References

External links
 
 

1972 American television series debuts
1974 American television series endings
1970s American drama television series
1970s American crime television series
English-language television shows
NBC Mystery Movie
NBC original programming
Television shows set in Boston
Television series by Universal Television